Karsten Krogner (born 16 June 1961) is a Danish sports shooter. He competed in the mixed skeet event at the 1988 Summer Olympics.

References

1961 births
Living people
Danish male sport shooters
Olympic shooters of Denmark
Shooters at the 1988 Summer Olympics
20th-century Danish people